Johanna Ullricka Bergstrøm Skagen (1839–1882), was a Swedish-born Norwegian photographer.  She is known as one of the first professional female photographers in Norway.

References 

1839 births
1882 deaths
19th-century Norwegian photographers